Born to Lose may refer to:
 "Born to Lose", associated with Ray Charles since 1962 and composed 1943 by Ted Daffan
 "Born to Lose", on LaVern Baker album Let Me Belong to You, 1970
 "Born to Lose", on Black Sabbath album The Eternal Idol, 1987
 "Born to Lose", on Shirley Bassey album Four Decades of Song (recorded 1976)
 "Born to Lose", on Johnny Thunders and the Heartbreakers album L.A.M.F., 1977
 "Born to Lose", on UFO album Obsession, 1978
 "Born to Lose", on Social Distortion album Somewhere Between Heaven and Hell, 1992
 "Born to Lose", on Black Label Society album Sonic Brew, 1998
 "Born to Lose", on King Adora single "Born to Lose/Kamikaze", 2003
"Born to Lose", on Motörhead album "The Wörld Is Yours", 2010
 "Born to Lose", on The Devil Wears Prada album Dead Throne, 2011
 "Born to Lose", on Sleigh Bells album Reign of Terror, 2012 
 "Born to Lose", on Zebrahead album Call Your Friends, 2013
 "Born to Lose", on American Football self-titled album, 2016
 “Born to Lose”, on The Avalanches album We Will Always Love You, 2020

See also
Born to Lose, Built to Win, an album by Juelz Santana
"Iron Horse/Born to Lose", a song by Motörhead from Motörhead